Pirateology: A Pirate Hunter's Companion is a book written by Dugald Steer, and designed by Nghiem Ta.  It was published in 2006 by Templar Publishing in the United Kingdom, and Candlewick Press in the United States.

This book is composed of the remains of what the fictional privateer William Lubber left behind, mainly his journal, which tells of the chase of Arabella Drummond, the notorious female pirate, across the seven seas. Included in the book is a replica of a treasure map, leading to Arabella Drummond's buried treasure.

Daily accounts in journal
September 13, 1723: Boston, Massachusetts
October 2, 1723: Ocracoke Inlet, North Carolina
October 25, 1723: Off Tortuga
November 5, 1723: Port Royal, Jamaica
March 20, 1724: Juan Fernández Island
June 27, 1724: Isla del Coco, near Panama
December 17, 1724: Off Canton, China
January 8, 1725: Krakatoa, Sunda Strait
May 22, 1725: Madagascar
March 5, 1726: Malta
May 31, 1726: Oak Island, Nova Scotia
June 1, 1726: Grand Banks, Newfoundland

Awards and honors
2007: Children's Illustrated Honor Book, 2007 Book Sense Book of the Year Awards

In other media

Video games
In October 2007, Codemasters announced a licensing agreement to create video games for the Wii and Nintendo DS based on Pirateology, as well as Dragonology and Wizardology. Nik Nak was to develop the Wii titles.

Film adaptation
On January 31, 2018, Paramount Pictures announced they were in the process of developing a film franchise centred around all 13 Ology books, by setting up a writers room currently consisting of Jeff Pinkner, Michael Chabon, Lindsey Beer, Joe Robert Cole, Nicole Perlman and Christina Hodson. The vision for the franchise is the hope that each of the writers will embrace the books by working with visual artists to create treatments which will eventually evolve into seven movie scripts with interconnected stories. Paramount also announced that Akiva Goldsman will act as overseer and producer of the franchise.

References

External links
Official website of the Ology series
Anne Yvonne Gilbert, Illustrator

2006 children's books
Books by Dugald Steer
Books illustrated by Anne Yvonne Gilbert
Books illustrated by Helen Ward
Books illustrated by Nghiem Ta
British children's books
Candlewick Press books
Children's fiction books
Pirate books